These are the results of the rhythmic individual all-around competition, one of the two events of the rhythmic gymnastics discipline contested at the 2004 Summer Olympics. The qualification and final rounds took place on August 27 and August 29 at the Galatsi Olympic Hall.

Qualification

Twenty-four gymnasts competed in the individual all-around event in the rhythmic gymnastics qualification round on August 27. The ten highest scoring gymnasts advanced to the final on August 29.

Almudena Cid of Spain competed for a place on the final, at the time it was a then record breaking appearance for a rhythmic gymnast, a feat she would broke four years later at the 2008 Summer Olympics.

Final

 TV — technical value; AV — artistical value; EX — execution.

References

External links
 Gymnastics Results.com

Women's rhythmic individual all-around
2004
2004 in women's gymnastics
Women's events at the 2004 Summer Olympics